The Első Emelet (Hungarian: "First Floor") were a Hungarian pop band formed in Budapest in 1982 by former members of two progressive rock bands: Solaris and Lobogó. Their music video for "Állj, Vagy Lövök!" ("Stop or I'll Shoot!") appeared as "Baby, Baby" by "First Floor" in the music video for "Money for Nothing" by British rock band Dire Straits. 

After just over 30 years of being active the band broke up in 2013.

Members
 Gábor Berkes – keyboards, vocals
 Csaba Bogdán – guitar, keyboards, vocals
 Béla Patkó Kiki – vocals
 Gábor Kisszabó – bass guitar, guitar, vocals
 Gábor Szentmihályi – percussion
 Zsolt Hastó – percussion
 István Tereh – backing vocals, percussion, manager
 Tamás Kelemen – guitar
 Zsolt Hastó – drums (from 2008–2013)
 Ferenc Rausch – drums (1982–1983)
 György Cser – vocals (1982)
 Vilmos Tóth – drums (1983)
 Szörényi Örs – drums (1990)

Discography

Studio albums 
 Első Emelet 1 (1984)
 Első Emelet 2 (1985)
 Első Emelet 3 (1986)
 Első Emelet 4 (1987)
 Naplemez (1988)
 Vadkelet (1989)
 Kis generáció (1990)
 Megyek a szívem után (2010)

Live albums 
 Turné '88 (1988)

Compilation albums 
 Best of (1997)

References

External links
 

Hungarian pop music groups
Musical groups established in 1982
Musical groups disestablished in 2013